Tom Cole Field is a 1,200-seat baseball stadium located in Flint, Michigan.  Located at Stan Broome Park, it is the home of the Mott Community College Bears baseball team.  

The stadium is also used for high school and amateur baseball.

External links
Tom Cole Field at Broome Park

College baseball venues in the United States
Baseball venues in Michigan
Buildings and structures in Flint, Michigan